= Porosity Storage Reservoir =

Artificial water storage reservoir located in shallow alluvial deposits

Porosity Storage Reservoirs are man-made water storage reservoirs located in shallow alluvial (sand and gravel) deposits. The porosity, or void space, refers to the open spaces between the sand and gravel, and it is in this area that the water is stored. By separating and isolating a portion of an alluvial deposits through the use of walls made of natural materials, large reservoirs of water (up to a 100,000 acre feet) can be built up to 150 feet below ground. Securely storing water underground in this way protects the water from evaporative loss, unwanted contamination and is seen as low impact to the environment, compared to traditional dams and above ground water reservoirs.

Porosity Storage Reservoir innovations and technologies were created by Donald O. Summers and Stanley R. Peters on behalf of the parent company PS Systems, Inc.
